Çayıralan is a town and district of Yozgat Province in the Central Anatolia region of Turkey. The average altitude is 1,500 m above sea level.  According to 2000 census, population of the district is 32,880 of which 14,046 live in the town of Çayıralan. It has one of the largest forest areas in Central Anatolia. The district also possesses marble mines.

Notes

References

External links
 District governor's official website 
 Municipality's official website 
 General information on Çayıralan 
 A nostalgic photo of Çayıralan
 A view of marble mines in Çayıralan

Districts of Yozgat Province
Populated places in Yozgat Province